Richmond Hill is a city in Bryan County, Georgia, United States. The population was 16,633 at the 2020 U.S. Census, an increase of almost 80% from the 2010 population of 9,281. Richmond Hill is part of the Savannah Metropolitan Statistical Area.

History 
Richmond Hill has a historical connection to industrialist Henry Ford. Ford used the town, formerly known as Ways Station, as a winter home and philanthropic social experiment, building the complex known as the Ford Farms along the Ogeechee River in the 1930s. After just one visit he chose this area as his winter home. Ford's dwelling was built on the site of Richmond Plantation, which was burned by elements of General William T. Sherman's army at the conclusion of the "March to the Sea". Ford's holdings eventually totaled  of agricultural and timber lands, most of which is now owned by the State of Georgia or ITT Rayonier, a timber company. Ford was also responsible for the construction of a number of public buildings, including a kindergarten, which now houses the museum of the Richmond Hill Historical Society, and a chapel which now houses St. Anne's Catholic Church. Both are located on Georgia S.R. 144, also known as Ford Avenue within the Richmond Hill city limits. The Ford Plantation has now been redeveloped as a luxury resort, with vacation cottages, a clubhouse, tennis, and golf. When it was suggested that the town be renamed "Ford", he declined, and instead Ways Station was renamed "Richmond Hill" after the site of Ford's home on the banks of the Ogeechee River.

Another plantation, Myrtle Grove, has been used in several movie and television productions.

Richmond Hill was incorporated as a city in 1962. The current mayor is Russ Carpenter. The previous mayor, Richard Davis served in that capacity since 1989. The city is governed by a mayor and a four-member city council.

Richmond Hill was the location of the discovery in 2004 of Benjaman Kyle, a man who suffers from retrograde amnesia as a result of a severe beating. In 2015, he was identified as William Burgess Powell.

Development
Real estate development in Richmond Hill has generally followed trends represented in the United States as a whole. Post-Civil War populations remained relatively stable until the arrival of industrialist Henry Ford in the 1930s. In the early 1970s, subdivisions began to spring up, and began a settlement trend that has continued steadily until the present. Subdivisions of varying quality, ranging from starter homes to exclusive, gated golf communities, have emerged. Locals attribute population growth to the nearest military base, Fort Stewart.

Geography
Richmond Hill is located along the eastern border of Bryan County. The Ogeechee River forms the eastern edge of the city (and the county line); an outlying portion of the city of Savannah is on the opposite side of the river.

U.S. Route 17 (Ocean Highway) passes through the city north of the original downtown. Interstate 95 passes through the western edge of the city, with access from Exit 87 (US 17) and Exit 90 (Georgia State Route 144/Ford Avenue).

Demographics

2020 census

As of the 2020 United States census, there were 16,633 people, 4,334 households, and 3,431 families residing in the city.

2000 census
As of the census of 2000, there were 6,959 people, 2,433 households, and 1,883 families living in the city. The racial makeup of the city was 81.28% White, 13.69% African American, 0.60% Native American, 1.42% Asian, 0.04% Pacific Islander, 1.28% from other races, and 1.68% from two or more races. Hispanic or Latino people of any race were 3.71% of the population.

There were 2,433 households, out of which 51.0% had children under the age of 18 living with them, 58.7% were married couples living together, 14.7% had a female householder with no husband present, and 22.6% were non-families. 19.2% of all households were made up of individuals, and 6.5% had someone living alone who was 65 years of age or older. The average household size was 2.83 and the average family size was 3.24.

The median income for a household in the city was $47,061, and the median income for a family was $54,457. Males had a median income of $36,823 versus $25,810 for females. The per capita income for the city was $18,891. About 9.8% of families and 10.3% of the population were below the poverty line, including 10.9% of those under age 18 and 6.1% of those age 65 or over.

Economy
Small businesses with fewer than 20 employees make up 93% of the employers.

Major employers 

Shopping areas
 Ford Plaza (S.R. 144 - Ford Ave.) - the largest shopping area in Richmond Hill, with two bookstores, Curves, three restaurants, two bars, sporting goods, flooring, real-estate, and attorneys.
 Station Exchange (S.R. 144 - Ford Ave.) - currently in foreclosure; most businesses have moved out.
 Parker Square (S.R. 144 - Ford Ave.) - built by Greg Parker; includes a deli, upscale clothing consignment shop, chiropractor, karate studio, and a dentist.
 Saw Mill Plaza (S.R. 144 - Ford Ave.) - remodeled in 2011; has a dance studio, pizza parlor, barber shop, hair salon, motor cycle repair, and the only laundromat in Richmond Hill.
 Publix Shopping Center (S.R. 144 - Ford Ave.) - anchored by Publix grocery store, with three restaurants (Asian, Breakfast, and Subway), liquor store, nail salon, chocolate shop, UPS Store, and ice cream shop
 Exchange Plaza (S.R. 144 - Ford Ave.) - has Verizon, AT&T Mobility, Pizza Hut, credit union, tanning salon, and urgent care center, as well as a small Mexican restaurant.

Education
Bryan County School District serves Richmond Hill. The city has six public schools for students between the ages of five to 21 (21 in cases of challenged high-school students). They are Richmond Hill Primary School (RHPS), Richmond Hill Elementary School (RHES), George Washington Carver Upper Elementary School (GWCES), McAllister Elementary School (MES), Richmond Hill Middle School (RHMS), and Richmond Hill High School (RHHS). Of the two high schools, Richmond Hill High has the highest scores in Bryan County. The city is currently expanding its schools due to a large spike in the number of people migrating to the city during the last thirty years. Two new elementary and middle schools have been built recently. Richmond Hill is expected to grow exponentially in the next few years based on the trend of the increasing population since the early-1990s.

Healthcare
In 2011, Winn Army Community Hospital opened to serve the large military population in the area. It serves military retirees and their families only.

Community

Events
Richmond Hill hosts a number of community events at J.F. Gregory Park. Throughout the year the community comes together for supporting special events and causes, such as:

Annual Easter Extravaganza
Annual Memorial Day Observance
Annual First Day of Summer Prayer Breakfast
National Night Out
Old Time Family Fourth of July Festival & Fireworks
Annual Pumpkin Patch
Great Ogeechee Seafood Festival, with c. 35,000 attendees
Annual Veterans Day Observance
Annual Chili Cook-off

Religion

While a small majority of citizens in Richmond Hill are non-religious, Christianity is the second largest. Christianity denominations include Protestant and Catholic. Richmond Hill is home to over 20 churches of various denominations.

Many church organizations participate cooperatively in outreach programs that benefit the community as a whole. The "Food for the Soul" soup kitchen, manned by ten separate churches that rotate on a weekly basis, delivers hot meals to families in need within Richmond Hill. The Way Station, another multiple church outreach program, has been in operation for over twenty years providing food, clothing, and other items that enhance the lives of families in the community.

Community service groups
 Richmond Hill Rotary Club
 Richmond Hill Exchange Club
 Richmond Hill Lions Club
 Richmond Hill Veterans of Foreign Wars, Post 7331
 Richmond Hill Garden Club - Senior's Center
 Richmond Hill Sons of Confederate Veterans
 Bryan Lodge #303 F&AM

Notable people 
 Nick Fitzgerald, college football quarterback
 Dominique Rikhi, cricketer

References

External links
 City of Richmond Hill official website
 Richmond Hill - Bryan County Chamber of Commerce
 Newcomers & Neighbors guide
 Bryan Neck Missionary Baptist Church historical marker
 Bryan Neck Presbyterian Church historical marker
 Canaan Church historical marker

Cities in Georgia (U.S. state)
Cities in Bryan County, Georgia
Savannah metropolitan area